Hagan is a city in Evans County, Georgia, United States. The population was 996 at the 2010 census, up from 898 in 2000.

History
The Georgia General Assembly incorporated the place as the City of Hagan in 1906. The community was named after Susan Hagan, the wife of the original owner of the town site.

Geography

Hagan is located at  (32.155286, -81.931872).

Climate

Hagan has a humid subtropical climate according to the Köppen classification. The city has hot and humid summers with average highs of 94 degrees and lows of 70 degrees in July. Winters are mild with average January highs of 61 degrees and lows of 36 degrees. Winter storms are rare, but they can happen on occasion.

Demographics

As of the census of 2000, there were 898 people, 362 households, and 229 families residing in the city. The racial makeup of the city was 65.48% White, 29.96% African American, 0.89% Asian, 3.01% from other races, and 0.67% from two or more races. Hispanic or Latino of any race were 5.01% of the population.

There were 362 households, out of which 30.7% had children under the age of 18 living with them, 46.1% were married couples living together, 12.7% had a female householder with no husband present, and 36.5% were non-families. 30.4% of all households were made up of individuals, and 7.7% had someone living alone who was 65 years of age or older.  The average household size was 2.44 and the average family size was 3.03.

In the city, the population was spread out, with 25.5% under the age of 18, 10.9% from 18 to 24, 29.6% from 25 to 44, 23.1% from 45 to 64, and 10.9% who were 65 years of age or older.  The median age was 34 years. For every 100 females, there were 98.2 males.  For every 100 females age 18 and over, there were 100.9 males.

The median income for a household in the city was $26,852, and the median income for a family was $30,500. Males had a median income of $30,139 versus $17,303 for females. The per capita income for the city was $15,351.  About 20.1% of families and 23.1% of the population were below the poverty line, including 34.0% of those under age 18 and 18.9% of those age 65 or over.

References

Cities in Georgia (U.S. state)
Cities in Evans County, Georgia